Krishna Arjun  is a 1997 Indian Hindi-language action film, produced & directed by Shailendra Shukla under the Prerna Films International banner. It stars Jeetendra, Vivek Mushran, Karina Grover, Upasna Singh  and music composed by Arup-Pranay.

Plot
Ramnath Yadav, a freedom fighter had died for the country, and his wife Sharda Yadav lives a poor but very respectable lifestyle with her two sons, Krishna and Arjun, in a small rural town in India. Years pass by, Krishna and Arjun have both grown up. Krishna and his mom would like to send Arjun to Bombay to study and become a professional. Accordingly, Arjun travels to Bombay, where he resides in a hostel, meets a beautiful collegian named Poonam, and both fall in love with each other. Then Arjun gets devastating news of the passing away of his mother. He travels home and finds that nothing is the same anymore, for Krishna has been arrested, found guilty of brutally raping and then killing a young school-teacher widow by the name of Meera, and unable to bear this shock of this disgrace, his mother has died. Arjun must now meet with Krishna and find out what had happened after he left town, and whether there is any truth to Krishna's crime.

Cast
Jeetendra as Krishna Yadav
Vivek Mushran as Arjun Yadav
Upasna Singh as Meera Krishnan
Rohini Hattangadi as Sharda Yadav 
Ashutosh Rana as Billoo Singh
Johny Lever as Rocky Dhillon
Raza Murad as Thakur Shamsher Singh 
Kiran Kumar as Rana Abbas
Puneet Issar as DIG Hidayath Ali Khan
Pramod Moutho as Jathashankar Tripathi
Javed Khan as Sewakram Deshmukh
Arun Bakshi as Inspector Chatursen Chaubey
Karina Grover as Poonam
Birbal
Jaimini Pathak
Poorva Joshi

Soundtrack

References

1990s Hindi-language films
Indian action films

External links